"Drink it Down" is the thirty-fifth single by L'Arc-en-Ciel, released on April 2, 2008. The single debuted at number one on the Oricon chart. It was the theme song of Devil May Cry 4 video game.

Track listing

References

2008 singles
L'Arc-en-Ciel songs
Japanese-language songs
Oricon Weekly number-one singles
Songs written by Hyde (musician)
2008 songs
Ki/oon Music singles